Etiquette is a studio album by Casiotone for the Painfully Alone, released in 2006. Etiquette is thought by many to have slightly abandoned the simple lo-fi "made in a basement" sound by including a more diverse range of instruments and a marginally higher production quality than previous albums.

Track listing
"Etiquette I.D." – 0:05
"New Year's Kiss" – 2:02
"Young Shields" – 3:04
"I Love Creedence" – 2:33
"Nashville Parthenon" – 2:55
"Scattered Pearls" – 2:42
"Happy Mother's Day" – 0:47
"Holly Hobby (version)" – 2:43
"Cold White Christmas" – 4:56
"Bobby Malone Moves Home" – 3:14
"Don't They Have Payphones Wherever You Were Last Night" – 2:21
"Love Connection" (Parenthetical Girls cover) – 3:14

References

Casiotone for the Painfully Alone albums
2006 albums